Frederick William McDarrah (November 5, 1926 – November 6, 2007) was an American staff photographer for The Village Voice and an author. He is best known for documenting the cultural phenomenon known as the Beat Generation from its inception in the 1950s. In his book The Artist's World in Pictures, co-authored with Thomas B. Hess, McDarrah documented the New York art world, the New York School and the world of Abstract expressionism in New York City during the late 1950s.

Biography
Born in Brooklyn of Catholic and Protestant descent, he said his father "did nothing, never worked, a manic depressive who used to sit by the window and just stare out. We used to live on Home Relief. My brother David and I went begging for food."

He bought his first camera at the 1939 World's Fair for 39 cents, but he did not start taking photographs as a vocation until he was a paratrooper in occupied Japan following World War II.

He was one of the first to photograph Bob Dylan.
He photographed people at the time of the Stonewall riots; those pictures were among those gathered in the book Gay Pride (1994), one of over a dozen books including his photographs.

Exhibitions
2015. "Fred W. McDarrah: The Artists's World". Solo at Steven Kasher Gallery. New York City
2018. "Fred W. McDarrah: New York Scenes." Solo at Steven Kasher Gallery.

Family
In 1960, he married Gloria Schoffel. They had two sons, Timothy and Patrick.

Death
He died in his sleep at his home in Greenwich Village a few hours after his 81st birthday.

Books by McDarrah
McDarrah, Fred W. The Beat Scene. Corinth Books, 1960
McDarrah, Fred W., and Gloria S. McDarrah. The Artist's World in Pictures. New York: Dutton, 1961
McDarrah, Fred W., and McDarrah, Timothy S.  Museums In New York.  New York: A Frommer Book, 1983
McDarrah, Fred W., and Patrick J. McDarrah. The Greenwich Village Guide: Sixteen Historic Walks, Includes Soho, Tribeca, and the East Village: Antique Shops, Bookstores, Theatres, Clubs, Restaurants, Art Galleries and More. Chicago, IL: Chicago Review, 1992
McDarrah, Fred W., Timothy S. McDarrah, and Robert Taylor. Gay Pride: Photographs from Stonewall to Today. Chicago, IL: Cappella, 1994
McDarrah, Fred W., and Gloria S. McDarrah. Beat Generation: Glory Days in Greenwich Village. New York: Schirmer, 1996
MacDarrah, Fred W., and Timothy S. MacDarrah. Kerouac and Friends: A Beat Generation Album. New York: Thunder's Mouth, 2002
McDarrah, Fred W., Gloria S. McDarrah, and Timothy S. McDarrah. Anarchy, Protest & Rebellion: And the Counterculture That Changed America. New York: Thunder's Mouth, 2003
McDarrah, Fred W. Artists and Writers of the 60s and 70s: An Exhibition of Vintage Prints at Steven Kasher Gallery, November 9, 2006-January 6, 2007. New York, NY: Steven Kasher Gallery, 2006

Books On McDarrah
Wilentz, Sean Fred W. McDarrah: New York Scenes, Abrams Books, 2018

References

External links
Fred W. McDarrah at artnet.com
Fred W. McDarrah at MoMA

1926 births
2007 deaths
20th-century American photographers
Writers from Brooklyn
People from Greenwich Village
The Village Voice people